George Danielson was a member of the Wisconsin State Assembly.

Biography
Danielson was born on June 14, 1834, in Christiania (now Oslo) in Norway. He first settled in Neenah, Wisconsin, in 1854. After moving to Rock County in 1856, he returned there in 1861. Danielson died on September 5, 1909.

Career
Danielson was elected to the Assembly in 1892. Other positions he held include town treasurer, city treasurer and alderman of Neenah. He was a Democrat.

References

Politicians from Neenah, Wisconsin
People from Rock County, Wisconsin
Democratic Party members of the Wisconsin State Assembly
Wisconsin city council members
City and town treasurers in the United States
1834 births
1909 deaths
Norwegian emigrants to the United States
19th-century American politicians